Callum Talbot (born 26 February 2001) is an Australian professional footballer who plays as a right back for A-League side Melbourne City.

Career

Sydney 
Born in Valletta, Malta, Talbot moved to Australia in 2003 when he was two-years-old. He played for Gymea United before moving on to Sutherland Sharks and then the Football New South Wales National Training Centre (FNSW NTC) in 2015, going on to link up with Sydney FC’s NPL side in 2019, at the age of 18. 

On 30 January 2021, Talbot made his professional debut for Sydney in the club’s A-League fixture against Macarthur FC. Sydney went on to beat Macarthur 3-0.

Melbourne City 
On 24 May 2022, A-League side Melbourne City announced the signing of Talbot on a three-year-deal, following his release from Sydney.

References

External links

2001 births
Living people
Australian soccer players
Association football defenders
Sydney FC players
National Premier Leagues players
A-League Men players
Australian people of Maltese descent
Maltese emigrants to Australia